Nava de Francia is a municipality in the province of Salamanca, autonomous community of Castile and León, Spain.

As of 2016 the municipality has a population of 142 inhabitants. Its area is 16,51 km².

References

Municipalities in the Province of Salamanca